Xianglian Wan  is a pale yellow to yellowish brown pill used in Traditional Chinese medicine to  "eliminate damp-heat, promote the flow of qi and relieve pain". It is slightly aromatic and tastes bitter. It is used when there are symptoms of "dysentery with tenesmus, abdominal pain and diarrhea".   The binding agent of the pill is honey.

Chinese classic herbal formula

See also
 Chinese classic herbal formula
 Bu Zhong Yi Qi Wan

References

Traditional Chinese medicine pills